The 1793 English cricket season was the 22nd in which matches have been awarded retrospective first-class cricket status and the seventh after the foundation of the Marylebone Cricket Club. The season saw 17 top-class matches played in the country.

Matches 
A total of 17 top-class matches were played during the season. These included matches played by teams from Berkshire, Essex, Kent, Middlesex and Surrey as well as a combined Surrey and Sussex side. Berkshire played the last of their three first-class fixtures, a match followed a month later by Oldfield's first first-class match featuring the same eleven players who had played for Berkshire.

First mentions
A number of players made their first appearances in first-class matches during the season, including:
 Henry Tufton
 John Tufton
 J. Hampton
 Edward Morant
 Carter
 Robert Walpole
 Luck
 Harry Bridger
 Zachariah Button

References

Further reading
 
 
 
 

1793 in English cricket
English cricket seasons in the 18th century